Robert Hardin Williams (September 27, 1909, Savannah, Tennessee – November 4, 1979) was a physician, specializing in endocrinology and diabetology. He was the 49th President of The Endocrine Society.

Biography
After growing up and graduating from high school in Savannah, Tennessee, Robert H. Williams graduated with a bachelor's degree in 1929 from Washington and Lee University and an M.D. in 1934 from Johns Hopkins School of Medicine. He was from 1934 to 1935 a medical intern in pathology at Boston City Hospital, where he was mentored in endocrinology by Fuller Albright and James Howard Means. From 1935 to 1937, Williams completed his medical training and residency in internal medicine at Vanderbilt University Hospital, which became Vanderbilt University Medical Center (VUMC). He was from 1937 to 1938 an instructor at the Johns Hopkins School of Medicine and from 1938 to 1939 worked at the Vanderbilt University School of Medicine. At Harvard Medical School he was from 1939 to 1940 a fellow, from 1940 to 1944 an instructor, from 1944 to 1946 a medical associate, and from 1946 to 1948 an assistant professor. In 1948 he resigned from Harvard Medical School to become the chair of the department medicine at the newly established University of Washington School of Medicine; he was the chair from 1948 to 1963 during the department's formative period.

He was the editor of Textbook of Endocrinology (W. B. Saunders, 1950) with a second edition in 1955 and many subsequent editions. The Williams Textbook of Endocrinology, 14th revised edition, was published in 2020. He was the editor of, and wrote seven chapters for, the 1973 book To Live and Die: When, Why, and How, "which addressed the issues of euthanasia, suicide, population planning, organ transplantation, body-mind-soul interrelations, and the afterlife."

In 1966 Williams was awarded the Banting Medal of the American Diabetes Association.

He married in 1941 and became the father of several children.

Selected publications

References

1909 births
1979 deaths
20th-century American physicians
American endocrinologists
American diabetologists
Washington and Lee University alumni
Johns Hopkins School of Medicine alumni
Harvard Medical School faculty
University of Washington faculty
People from Savannah, Tennessee